WSPR may refer to:

 WSPR (AM), a radio station (1490 AM) licensed to serve West Springfield, Massachusetts, United States
 WACM (AM), a radio station (1270 AM) licensed to serve Springfield, Massachusetts, which held the call sign WSPR from 1936 to 2016
 WSPR (amateur radio software), protocol for weak signal propagation